See also carne-seca, a Brazilian dried meat.

Carne seca ("dried meat" in Spanish) is a type of dried beef used in Mexican cuisine.

Regional variants

Northern Mexico 
In northern Mexican cuisine, particularly the states of Chihuahua, Sonora, and Nuevo León, carne seca is cooked in a dish called machacado (named machaca in other states), which includes tomatoes, onions, chile verde, and eggs. Sometimes, potatoes are included or used in lieu of eggs.

Southwestern United States

Arizona 
In Arizona, according to Marian Burros of The New York Times, carne seca is a popular meat filling used by Tucson-area Mexican restaurants in enchiladas, chimichangas, and tacos, and is sometimes mixed with eggs.

California 
According to The Oxford Companion to American Food and Drink, the newly arrived Anglo-Californians had acquired the taste for carne seca from their Californio neighbors during the 19th century California Gold Rush era.

New Mexico 
In New Mexico, the term carne seca in New Mexican cuisine refers to a thinly sliced variant of jerky, the style influenced by Hispano, Navajo, and Pueblo communities resulting in a crispy consistency reminiscent of a potato chip or a cracker.

See also

 List of dried foods

References

Dried meat
Mexican cuisine

es:Carne seca
pt:Carne-seca